Dorcadion irinae is a species of beetle in the family Cerambycidae. It was described by Mikhail Leontievich Danilevsky in 1997. It is known from Kazakhstan.

References

irinae
Beetles described in 1997